Veska may refer to:

 Véska, a village in Dolany (Olomouc District), Czech Republic
 Veska, a fictional character in 1956 Bulgarian film Item One
 Veska (shopping mall), a shopping mall in Pirkkala, Finland